Escuderia TEC-Auto is a racing team from Spain. It was founded in 2003 after the acquisition by Carlos Cosidó and Paul South of the Azteca Motor Sport. In 2004 the team changed its name and appears for the first time with the denomination of TEC Auto. That year the drivers were the Argentinian Ricardo Risatti and the Dutch Ferdinand Kool.

The 2006 was the year of the first title thanks to the Argentinian Risatti, but the team still failed the victory in the Teams Championship, coming second, only behind Racing Engineering. In 2007 the team repeat victory in the Drivers Championship, this time with the Spanish Máximo Cortés and finally the team win the Teams Championship.

For the 2008 season, TEC Auto will still focus exclusively on the Spanish Formula 3, but with the aim of major competitions, such like GP2 Series.

Results

Spanish Formula 3 

D.C. = Drivers' Championship position, T.C. = Teams' Championship position.

Timeline

References

External links
(Spanish) Official website

Spanish auto racing teams
Euroformula Open Championship teams
Auto racing teams established in 2003